Cymbopogon citratus, commonly known as West Indian lemon grass or simply lemon grass, is a tropical plant native to Maritime Southeast Asia and introduced to many tropical regions.

Cymbopogon citratus is often sold in stem form. While it can be grown in warmer temperate regions, such as the UK, it is not hardy to frost.

Morphology 
Cymbopogon citratus is part of the grass family, Poaceae. They contain simple, bluish-green leaves with entire margins and are linear in shape. The blades tend to be 18–36 inches long. Like other grasses, the leaves also have parallel venation.

Distribution
Cymbopogon citratus is native to Island Southeast Asia (Malesia). It has been introduced extensively to South Asia since precolonial times. After World War I, lemongrass was introduced to Madagascar, South America, and Central America. It has now been naturalized throughout the tropics and subtropics worldwide.

In its native range, Cymbopogon citratus is known as sereh, serai, or serai dapur in Indonesia and Malaysia; and tanglad (from Proto-Austronesian *Caŋelaj originally referring to Themeda gigantea, a type of elephant grass), salai, or balioko in the Philippines.

Culinary uses

Cymbopogon citratus is abundant in the Philippines and Indonesia where it is known as tanglad or sereh respectively Its fragrant leaves are traditionally used in cooking, particularly for lechon and roasted chicken.

The dried leaves can also be brewed into a tea, either alone or as a flavoring in other teas, imparting a flavor reminiscent of lemon juice but with a mild sweetness without significant sourness or tartness.

In Sri Lanka, lemongrass is known as sera (සේර). It is used as a herb in cooking, in addition to its use for the essential oils.

Lemongrass in Thailand is called takhrai (ตะไคร้). It is the essential ingredient of tom yam and tom kha kai. Fresh thin slices of lemongrass stem also used in miangpla, as a snack food.

Medicinal uses

The leaves of Cymbopogon citratus have been used in traditional medicine and are often found in herbal supplements and teas. Evidence of effective Cymbopogon citratus essential oil anti-protozoa activity against Leishmania amazonensis.

Chemical composition 
Lemon grass oil contains 65–85% citral in addition to myrcene, citronellal, citronellol, linalool and geraniol. Hydrosteam distillation, condensation, and cooling can be used to separate the oil from the water. The hydrosol, as a by-product of the distillation process, is used for the production of skin care products such as lotions, creams, and facial cleansers. The main ingredients in these products are lemon grass oil and "negros oil" (mixture of lemon grass oil with virgin coconut oil) used in aromatherapy.

Citronellol is an essential oil constituent from Cymbopogon citratus, Cymbopogon winterianus, and Lippia alba. Citronellol has been shown to lower blood pressure in rats by a direct effect on the vascular smooth muscle leading to vasodilation. In a small, randomized, controlled trial, an infusion made from C. citratus was used as an inexpensive remedy for the treatment of oral thrush in HIV/AIDS patients.

Laboratory studies have shown cytoprotective, antioxidant, and anti-inflammatory properties in vitro.

Traditional medicinal use 
In the folk medicine of the Krahô people of Brazil, it is believed to have anxiolytic, hypnotic, and anticonvulsant properties.

In traditional medicine of India the leaves of the plant are used as stimulant, sudorific, antiperiodic, and anticatarrhal, while the essential oil is used as carminative, depressant, analgesic, antipyretic, antibacterial, and antifungal agent.

Effect on insects

Beekeepers sometimes use lemon grass oil in swarm traps to attract swarms. Lemon grass oil has also been tested for its ability to repel the pestilent stable fly, which bite domestic animals.

See also
GABAA receptor
GABAA receptor positive allosteric agonists

References

External links
Cymbopogon citratus List of Chemicals (Dr. Duke's)
Cymbopogon citratus from the Biodiversity Heritage Library
'Citronella – anticeptic and anti-inflammation' in Vietnam botanical life

citratus
Grasses of India
Flora of Nepal
Flora of Sri Lanka
Medicinal plants of Asia
Anxiolytics
Antidepressants
Beekeeping
Herbs
Plants described in 1906